Norman Lewis Corwin (May 3, 1910 – October 18, 2011) was an American writer, screenwriter, producer, essayist and teacher of journalism and writing. His earliest and biggest successes were in the writing and directing of radio drama during the 1930s and 1940s.

Corwin was among the first producers to regularly use entertainmenteven light entertainmentto tackle serious social issues. In this area, he was a peer of Orson Welles and William N. Robson, and an inspiration to other later radio/TV writers such as Rod Serling, Gene Roddenberry, Norman Lear, J. Michael Straczynski and Yuri Rasovsky.  His work was very influential on successful creative and performing artists, including Ray Bradbury, Charles Kuralt, The Firesign Theatre, Robert Altman, and Robin Williams among many others.

He was born to Samuel and Rose Corwin in Boston, Massachusetts. A major figure during the Golden Age of Radio, his work was very influential both at the time and later. He has been called "The Grand Master Of American Audio Theatre." During the 1930s and 1940s he was a writer and producer of many radio programs in many genres: history, biography, fantasy, fiction, poetry and drama. He was the writer and creator of series such as The Columbia Workshop, 13 By Corwin, 26 By Corwin and others. After leaving the CBS Network, he was Head of Special Media Programming for the United Nations in the early 1950s, producing radio programs explaining the U.N.'s organization and goals, and documenting some of its efforts worldwide. He was a lecturer in Journalism at the University of Southern California until he was 97.

Corwin won a One World Award, two Peabody Medals, an Emmy Award, a Golden Globe Award, a duPont-Columbia Award; he was nominated for an Academy Award for Writing Adapted Screenplay for Lust for Life (1956). On May 12, 1990, he received an Honorary Doctorate from Lincoln College. In 1996, he received the Doctor of Humane Letters honoris causa from California Lutheran University. Corwin was inducted into the National Radio Hall of Fame in 1993.

A documentary film on Corwin's life, A Note of Triumph: The Golden Age of Norman Corwin, won an Academy Award for Best Documentary (Short Feature) in 2006. Les Guthman's feature documentary on Mr. Corwin's career, Corwin aired on PBS in the 1990s. He was inducted into the Pacific Pioneer Broadcasters Diamond Circle in 1994.

On Corwin's 100th Birthday, the Writers Guild Of America West gave him a "Gala" in Hollywood, which was hosted by Leonard Maltin and featured live performances of two of his favorite works and birthday speeches and reminiscences by many people, including Carl Reiner, Hal Kanter, William Shatner, and others. On that occasion, the National Audio Theatre Festival organization announced the creation of the Norman Corwin Award for Excellence in Audio Theatre, which is given annually to an individual or group who have made significant contributions to the art form in the United States.

Early years 

Norman Lewis Corwin was the third of four children.  His parents were Rose, a homemaker, and Sam, a printer. They raised their family in East Boston, MA, before moving to Winthrop, MA when Norman was thirteen. Norman graduated from Winthrop High School, but unlike his brothers, he did not attend college. His earliest goal was to be a writer. Because of his interest in writing, he sought a position in journalism and was ultimately hired by the Greenfield (MA) Recorder as a cub reporter when he was only seventeen.  In Greenfield, he reported on the courts and was also a film critic. Several years later, Corwin was hired by the Springfield (MA) Republican.

Radio career
While living and working in Springfield in the early 1930s, he became involved with radio broadcasting.  He first worked as the radio editor of the Springfield Republican and subsequently began broadcasting his own radio program.  The date of his first broadcast has been reported as early as 1931 by R. Leroy Bannerman; but the Springfield (MA) Republican reported that his first program, Rhymes and Cadences, a show during which Corwin read poetry, and his friend Benjamin Kalman offered musical interludes on the piano, debuted in March 1934 on WBZ in Boston and WBZA in Springfield. As radio editor of the Republican, he became known for his column "Radiosyncracies," which he published under the pseudonym 'Vladimir Shrdlu.' He also worked as a news commentator over WBZ and WBZA. In June 1935, Corwin accepted an executive position in Cincinnati at station WLW.  By 1937, Corwin was hired to host a poetry program called "Poetic License" on New York station WQXR, which led to his being hired by the CBS Radio Network to produce and direct cultural programs. He remained with CBS until 1949.

The first program he produced and hosted for CBS was "Words Without Music," the goal of which, Corwin said, was to make poetry more entertaining.  It went on the air over CBS affiliate WABC in New York in early December 1938.  Corwin continued to produce and host a wide range of programs for CBS.  In December 1941, he created a program to commemorate the 150th anniversary of the United States Bill of Rights: We Hold These Truths was first broadcast on December 15, 1941.  Corwin said it was written at the "invitation" of the U.S. Office of Facts and Figures. He recalled being on a train on his way to California to produce the program when news of the attack on Pearl Harbor came to him.  He sent a telegram to Washington at the next stop, asking if the OFF still wanted the program done.  When he got to Albuquerque, a telegram was waiting for him: "the President says, 'now more than ever.'"  Many radio and movie stars of the day featured, along with an epilogue by President Franklin Delano Roosevelt.  With an audience of 60 million listeners it became one of the most famous ever produced on radio.  In 1941, he received a Peabody Award for that program.

In 1942, Corwin and Edward R. Murrow combined to produce An American in England on CBS radio. Corwin intentionally avoided interviewing government officials, choosing instead to focus on everyday people and how they were affected by the war. He made weekly reports from England via shortwave August 3 – September 7, then did four more episodes December 1–22 after he had returned to New York City.

Corwin's most famous work is On a Note of Triumph, a celebration of the Allied victory in Europe, first broadcast on VE Day, May 8, 1945.  Not knowing where he would be when the end came, broadcast historian Erik Barnouw wrote, Corwin had performers ready in both New York City and Los Angeles.  The program went on (from the Los Angeles studios of CBS Radio Station KNX), with Martin Gabel as host/narrator and with William L. Shirer (via cable from New York) re-creating his role as reporter in the Compiègne forest covering the French surrender to Germany. Corwin wrote a similar program for CBS, Fourteen August, which was broadcast on V-J Day.  This critically acclaimed broadcast earned him a Distinguished Achievement Award from Radio Life magazine.

Corwin was also the first winner of the One World Award established by the Common Council for American Unity along with the (Wendell) Willkie Memorial of Freedom House. The award's winner was given an around the world trip. He won the award for his contributions in the field of mass communication to the concept of the world becoming more unified.  In June 1946, he set out from New York for a 4-month journey. He interviewed both world leaders and ordinary citizens, accompanied by a CBS recording engineer with 225 pounds of magnetic wire recording equipment. His 100 hours of recorded interviews was transcribed and took up 3700 pages. The CBS network then molded his work into a 13-part documentary that was aired in the Winter and Spring of 1947. Programs featured Great Britain, Western Europe, Sweden and Poland, Russia, Czechoslovakia, Italy, Egypt and India, Shanghai and Cities of the Far East, The Philippines, Australia, and New Zealand.

Post-CBS career

After leaving CBS in March 1949, Corwin went to work for the radio division of the United Nations; in charge of special projects, his first production was "Citizen of the World" in July 1949.  He ultimately left radio around 1952; some sources say he was frustrated by what he felt was radio's over-reaction to Mccarthyism; other sources say he left radio after persistent accusations that he was a Communist sympathizer, a charge which he always vehemently denied. The House Un-American Activities Committee also named him among a number of other entertainers and performers in a 1951 list of alleged Communist sympathizers.  The list included conductor Leonard Bernstein, actor Lee J. Cobb, and architect Frank Lloyd Wright.  After leaving radio, Corwin and produced some work for television, including his first televised play, "Ann Rutledge," which starred Grace Kelly. He also wrote a number of motion picture screenplays, including The Blue Veil (1951), Scandal at Scourie (1953), Lust for Life (1956), and The Story of Ruth (1961).  In the early 1970s Corwin produced and hosted the television show Norman Corwin Presents.  In 1979 he hosted Academy Leaders, a weekly showcase for short films which had won or been nominated for an Academy Award. Corwin wrote several books, which include Trivializing America; plus many essays, letters, articles and plays.

In the 1980s Corwin was one of the writing teachers of J. Michael Straczynski, creator of the television series Babylon 5. Stracyzynski named a recurring character in the series, David Corwin, after Norman. On the rec.arts.babylon5.moderated Usenet newsgroup, Stracyzynski wrote a series of posts on Norman Corwin's work.

Corwin wrote and directed two plays produced on Broadway, The Rivalry (1959) and The World of Carl Sandburg (1960). According to Ray Bradbury, Corwin was responsible for the eventual publication of Bradbury's The Martian Chronicles.

Composer David Raksin's "reverent orchestral theme" for the 1950 MGM film The Next Voice You Hear... was later published with original lyrics by Corwin as a hymn, "Hasten the Day".

During the 1990s, Corwin returned to radio drama, producing a series of radio plays for National Public Radio. In 1993, Corwin was finally inducted into the Radio Hall of Fame after a long career. And in 2001, NPR aired six new plays by Corwin under the title More By Corwin. He also lectured at USC as a visiting professor and was also on the Advisory Board of the National Audio Theatre Festival. Corwin celebrated his 100th birthday in May 2010.  Corwin died at the age of 101 on October 18, 2011.

Marriage, children, and family
Corwin was married in 1947 to actress Katherine Locke. They had two children – an adopted son, Anthony Leon, and a daughter, Diane Arlene. Katherine Locke died in 1995.

The Corwin family had longevity in its genes.  Norman's father, Samuel, died in 1987 at age 110.  His older brother, Emil, retired at 96 from a distinguished federal government career, and died in 2011 at age 107.  Norman Corwin also died in 2011, at age 101.

Religious views
Corwin was Jewish, and his parents observed Judaism (his father, Sam Corwin, attended holiday services until his death at 110). While not an observant Jew, Corwin infused much of his work with the ideas of the Hebrew Prophets. One of the prayerbooks of American Reform Judaism, Shaarei Tefila: Gates of Prayer, contains a portion of the Prayer from the finale of Corwin's On a Note of Triumph (see link to full text below).

Lord God of test-tube and blueprint
Who jointed molecules of dust and shook them till their name was Adam,
Who taught worms and stars how they could live together,
Appear now among the parliaments of conquerors and give instruction to their schemes:
Measure out new liberties so none shall suffer for his father's color or the credo of his choice:
Post proofs that brotherhood is not so wild a dream as those who profit by postponing it pretend:
Sit at the treaty table and convoy the hopes of the little peoples through expected straits,
And press into the final seal a sign that peace will come for longer than posterities can see ahead,
That man unto his fellow man shall be a friend forever.

Works

"Golden Age" works in radio drama
Corwin wrote and produced over 100 programs during the golden age of radio.  Notable programs include:

The Plot to Overthrow Christmas – December 25, 1938
They Fly through the Air with the Greatest of Ease – February 19, 1939
Spoon River Anthology – March 1939
Descent of the Gods – August 3, 1940
Mary and the Fairy – August 31, 1940
Psalm for a Dark Year – November 9, 1940
We Hold These Truths – December 15, 1941
America at War (series) – February 14, 1942
The Lonesome Train – March 21, 1944
Untitled – May 30, 1944
Home For the 4th – July 4, 1944
El Capitan and the Corporal – July 25, 1944
On a Note of Triumph – May 8, 1945
The Undecided Molecule – July 17, 1945
14 August – August 14, 1945
God and Uranium – August 19, 1945
Hollywood Fights Back – October 26, 1947
Could Be – September 8, 1949
Document A/777 – March 26, 1950

Later works in radio drama
In recent years National Public Radio commissioned a number of new plays by Corwin; the series was called More By Corwin.

Our Lady Of The Freedoms, And Some Of Her Friends – A play about the Statue of Liberty.
No Love Lost – A lively debate about the nature of democracy in America, in the form of an imaginary dialogue between Thomas Jefferson, Alexander Hamilton and Aaron Burr; the work is based on their writings. This play featured Lloyd Bridges, Jack Lemmon, Martin Landau and Corwin's friend William Shatner. Shatner appeared in a number of Corwin productions.
The Writer With The Lame Left Hand – Based on the life story of Miguel de Cervantes, author of Don Quixote. This production featured Ed Asner, Charles Durning, Samantha Eggar and William Shatner.
The Curse Of 589 is a comedy about a physicist (William Shatner) who comes across an honest-to-goodness real life fairy, with a working magic wand.
The Secretariat – A play on the meaning of prayer. This production featured Hume Cronyn and Jessica Tandy, Phil Proctor, and William Shatner.
50 Years after 14 August – A reflection on the end of World War II; co-produced with Dan Gediman.

Published works
A selected listing of books by Corwin, excluding collections of his radio dramas:
So Say the Wise: A Community Of Modern Mind, New York: George Sully Company, 1929 – A compendium of quotations, concentrating on current personalities. Compiled by Corwin and Hazel Cooley.
Holes in a Stained Glass Window, Secaucus, NJ: L. Stuart, 1978  – Collection of Corwin's Essays, Articles and Poetry. Contains both Prayer for the 70s and Jerusalem Printout
Trivializing America, Secaucus, NJ: Lyle Stuart, 1983 – A best-selling critique of the failings of contemporary American culture
Norman Corwin's Letters, edited by Jack Langguth – New York: Barricade Books Inc., 1994 – Compilation of letters written throughout Corwin's career.

Addendum: The Plot to Overthrow Christmas (Opera; music by Walter Scharf; libretto by Norman Corwin) was written in 1960; sole performance in 2000 at Brigham Young University. The opera exists in manuscript form only. Composer and Librettest unable to agree on terms for further use. Walter Scharf died in 2003.

Footnotes

Further reading
 Jacob Smith and Neil Verma (eds.), Anatomy of Sound: Norman Corwin and Media Authorship. Berkeley: University of California Press, 2016. 
 Wayne Soini, Norman Corwin; His Early Life and Radio Career, 1910–1950. Jefferson, N.C.: McFarland & Co., Inc., 2021.

Sources

Listen to
 ''On a Note of Triumph" excerpt: "Prayer"

Norman Corwin hosting Poetic License on WQXR, January 5, 1938.
Audio from 20 Norman Corwin Presents television productions 1972 
The Corwin Cycle: WNYC's 1942 revival of his works. at the WNYC Archives

External links

 
 
 
 The Norman Corwin Award For Excellence In Audio Theatre
 Corwin Award Nominations
 "Norman Corwin, R.I.P.," by Terry Teachout, including links to mp3 files of airchecks of On a Note of Triumph and The Plot to Overthrow Christmas
 Norman Corwin Collection at the American Radio Archive located at the Thousand Oaks Library
 Norman Corwin Papers at Syracuse University Special Collections Research Center
 The Poet Laureate of Radio: An Interview with Norman Corwin read Leonard Maltin's review of this interview DVD of Corwin:
 The Effort to Honor Norman Corwin with The Congressional Gold Medal
 The National Audio Theatre Festivals homepage

1910 births
2011 deaths
American centenarians
American radio directors
American radio producers
American radio writers
American male screenwriters
Jewish American dramatists and playwrights
Peabody Award winners
Writers from Boston
American male dramatists and playwrights
20th-century American dramatists and playwrights
20th-century American male writers
Screenwriters from Massachusetts
Men centenarians
21st-century American Jews